The R344 road is a regional road in Ireland, located in west County Galway. It cuts off the loop made by the N59 through Clifden and Letterfrack.

References

Regional roads in the Republic of Ireland
Roads in County Galway